Systematic Biology is a peer-reviewed scientific journal published by Oxford University Press on behalf of the Society of Systematic Biologists. It covers the theory, principles, and methods of systematics as well as phylogeny, evolution, morphology, biogeography, paleontology, genetics, and the classification of all living things.

The journal was established in 1952 as Systematic Zoology and obtained its current title in 1992.

References

External links
 
 Submission website
 Society of Systematic Biologists

Systematics journals
Bimonthly journals
English-language journals
Oxford University Press academic journals
Publications established in 1952